Harding School of Theology, known until 2011 as Harding University Graduate School of Religion, is located in Memphis, Tennessee, in the United States. It is an entity related to the private Christian university associated with the Churches of Christ known as Harding University, the main campus of which is in Searcy, Arkansas.  Harding School of Theology exists primarily to train religious ministers for congregations of the Churches of Christ.  It is located in East Memphis on a campus which consists of part of a large estate given by a wealthy donor, on property shared with the K-12 church affiliated private school Harding Academy.

In 2011 the institution's administration announced the change of name, from Harding University Graduate School of Religion to Harding School of Theology. The name changed represented a "rebranding strategy that seeks to reflect better the School's goal of equipping and inspiring servants of Christ with deeper faith and higher standards of scholarship"—as indicated in the alumni magazine.

History

Harding University began offering graduate studies in Bible and ministry at its campus in Searcy, Arkansas, in 1952. In 1955 Harding started to offer these classes as an extension program in Memphis, and in 1958 the Harding University Graduate School of Religion (HUGSR) became a permanent branch of Harding University.  Dr. W. B. West was the founding dean of HUGSR.

Academics

Harding School of Theology is accredited by the Association of Theological Schools in the United States and Canada.  It offers several degrees, including the Master of Arts (MA), Master of Arts in Christian Ministry, Master of Arts in Counseling, Master of Divinity (M.Div.), and Doctor of Ministry (D.Min.).  Degrees may include emphasis or concentration options.

Approximately half of Harding School of Theology's 240 students live outside the Memphis region.  Harding School of Theology offers courses on-line and in one-week intensive formats (in addition to the regular semester format) to accommodate these students.

Campus

The  Harding School of Theology campus is located at 1000 Cherry Road in Memphis on land that used to be part of the E. L. King Ranch.  Today, the old ranch mansion houses the administrative and faculty offices.  The W. B. West classroom building includes an auditorium and hospitality room in addition to classrooms.  Students who choose to live on campus may rent one of 23 apartments in the Benson, Harding, and Brewer buildings.  There is also a fitness center and a student lounge available to all students.

The L. M. Graves Memorial Library was built in 1964, and subsequent major additions were constructed in 1978 and 2006.  The library contains over 140,000 book volumes and 24,000 periodical volumes, with 615 current subscriptions to periodicals and annuals.  The library collection is specialized, focusing in areas relevant to Christian theology and ministry, including counseling.

Notes

External links
Official Site

Universities and colleges affiliated with the Churches of Christ
Universities and colleges in Memphis, Tennessee
Seminaries and theological colleges in Tennessee
Harding University